Alan Sealls is an American television meteorologist and educator. For two decades, he worked as chief meteorologist for WKRG-TV in Mobile, Alabama. Born in New York, Sealls holds bachelors and master's degrees from Cornell University and Florida State, respectively. He worked at television stations in Georgia, Wisconsin, and Illinois before settling in Mobile in 1999.

Sealls is a fourteen-time Emmy Award-winner, and is a Fellow of the American Meteorological Society, a distinction held by a small fraction of meteorologists. In 2017, his weather forecasting for Hurricane Irma went viral on social media, leading to national news coverage.

Background
Sealls was born in Mount Vernon, New York. He earned his bachelor's degree in meteorology from Cornell University, and his master's degree from Florida State University. He began his broadcasting career at WALB-TV in Albany, Georgia. From 1988 to 1992, he worked at WTMJ-TV/AM in Milwaukee, Wisconsin. From there, he worked at Chicago's WGN-TV for five years (which included national exposure on WGN's superstation feed), and then at WMAQ-TV; he also taught meteorology classes at Columbia College Chicago.

He moved south to Mobile in 1999, where he joined WKRG-TV. He teaches weather broadcasting at the University of South Alabama each spring, according to the news station's website. In addition, he has produced over four dozen weather videos for schools, distributed throughout North America.

In 2017, a segment of Sealls updating viewers on Hurricane Irma went viral on social media, topping the front page of Reddit and becoming the third most trending clip on YouTube. A number of commenters praised Sealls' calm, patient demeanor, likening his delivery to Bob Ross or Mr. Rogers. The clips attracted news coverage from The Washington Post. For Sealls, the moment was gratifying: "It was amazing that something that I’ve always done, the exact same way, suddenly went viral. It was a positive thing, because most things that start trending on the internet are, in my opinion, either goofy or silly or somehow embarrassing – things that don’t necessarily have value in the long run. But this is one where people got excited about science, they got excited about learning, so to me, that was a really wonderful thing."

In 2019, he parted ways with WKRG after being unable to negotiate a contract renewal. Sealls confirmed he plans to "remain active both in the community and as a meteorologist."

It was announced on November 19, 2019 that Alan would be returning to the airwaves starting in January 2020 on WPMI-TV.

Awards and recognition
Sealls holds his professional certifications from the AMS (American Meteorological Society) and the NWA (National Weather Association). He is a Fellow of the AMS—"a distinction held by a small fraction of meteorologists," according to WKRG. Sealls presently serves as a Councilor for the AMS; he has served as a NWA Seal Panelist, and then Chairman; a Councilor for the NWA; and as a Board Chair for the AMS Seal. He is also on the NWA Diversity Committee and acts as a NWA mentor.

Sealls is a thirteen-time regional Emmy Award-winner, and won a national award from the AMS in 2009 for a series on climate change. In 2015, he received a best-in-state award for his documentary retrospective on Hurricane Ivan. In 2017, he received a Dr. Martin Luther King Jr. award for community service from People United to Advance the Dream.

References 

Living people
Cornell University alumni
Florida State University alumni
Weather presenters
American meteorologists
Year of birth missing (living people)
Fellows of the American Meteorological Society
Regional Emmy Award winners